The Huanghai N2 is a mid-size Pickup truck produced and sold by SG Automotive (曙光汽车) under the Huanghai Auto (黄海) marque.

Overview

The Huanghai N2 pickup truck debuted on the Chinese car market in 2015.

The Huanghai N2 is available with four engines including a 2.4 liter four-cylinder petrol engine, a 2.4 liter four-cylinder turbo petrol engine, a 2.5 liter turbocharged four-cylinder diesel engine, and a 2.8 liter turbocharged four-cylinder diesel engine. Transmission options include a 5-speed manual gearbox, a 6-speed manual gearbox, and a 5-speed automatic gearbox. Prices of the Huanghai N2 ranges from 92,800 yuan to 187,800 yuan.

References

External links

 Huanghai Auto website

N2
Pickup trucks
2010s cars
Rear-wheel-drive vehicles
All-wheel-drive vehicles
Cars introduced in 2015
Trucks of China